A Hard Day's Night is a 1964 musical comedy film directed by Richard Lester and starring the English rock band the Beatles—John Lennon, Paul McCartney, George Harrison and Ringo Starr—during the height of Beatlemania. It was written by Alun Owen and originally released by United Artists. The film portrays 36 hours in the lives of the group as they prepare for a television performance.

The film was a financial and critical success and was nominated for two Academy Awards including Best Original Screenplay. Forty years after its release, Time magazine rated it as one of the 100 all-time great films. In 1997, British critic Leslie Halliwell described it as a "comic fantasia with music; an enormous commercial success with the director trying every cinematic gag in the book" and awarded it a full four stars. The film is credited as being one of the most influential of all musical films, inspiring numerous spy films, the Monkees' television show and pop music videos, and various other low-budget musical film vehicles starring British pop groups, such as the Gerry and the Pacemakers film Ferry Cross the Mersey and John Boorman's vehicle for The Dave Clark Five, Catch Us If You Can.

In 1999, the British Film Institute ranked it the 88th greatest British film of the 20th century.

Plot 

The Beatles evade a horde of fans while boarding a train for London to film a televised concert. En route, they meet Paul McCartney's trouble-making grandfather for the first time. The band play cards and entertain some schoolgirls before arriving at the London station, where they are quickly driven to a hotel and begin to feel confined. Their manager Norm tasks them with answering all their fan mail, but they sneak out to party, only to be caught by Norm and taken back. They then find out that Paul's grandfather went to a gambling club using an invitation sent to Ringo, and bring him back to the hotel.

The next day, the Beatles arrive at a TV studio for a performance. After the initial rehearsal, the producer assumes bad faith in them due to something Paul's grandfather said. After a mundane press conference, they leave through a fire escape and cavort in a field until forced off by the owner. Back in the studio, they are separated when a woman named Millie recognizes John Lennon but cannot recall who he is. George Harrison is lured into a trendmonger's office to audition for an advertisement with a popular female model. The band return to rehearse a second song and, after a quick trip to makeup, smoothly go through a third and earn a break.

An hour before the final run-through, Ringo Starr is forced to chaperone Paul's grandfather and takes him to the canteen for tea while he reads a book. The grandfather manipulates Ringo into going outside to experience life rather than reading books, passing a surprised John and Paul on the way out. He tries to have a quiet drink in a pub, takes pictures, walks alongside the river and rides a bicycle along a railway station platform. After nearly injuring a parrot and accidentally causing a woman to fall into a newly dug hole, Ringo is apprehended by a policeman as a troublemaker, and is joined by Paul's grandfather shortly after for attempting to sell Beatles photos with forged signatures. The grandfather runs back to the studio and tells the others about Ringo. Norm sends John, Paul and George to retrieve him. While doing so, the boys wind up in a Keystone Cops-style foot chase before arriving back at the studio with Ringo, with only minutes to spare before airtime. The televised concert goes on as planned, after which the Beatles are whisked away to another performance via helicopter.

Cast 

 John Lennon as himself
 Paul McCartney as himself
 George Harrison as himself
 Ringo Starr as himself
 Wilfrid Brambell as John McCartney, Paul's grandfather
 Norman Rossington as Norm, the Beatles' manager
 John Junkin as Shake, the Beatles' road manager
 Victor Spinetti as the TV director
 Anna Quayle as Millie
 Deryck Guyler as police sergeant
 Richard Vernon as Johnson, the gentleman on the train
 Edward Malin as the hotel waiter
 Robin Ray as the TV floor manager
 Lionel Blair as the TV choreographer
 Alison Seebohm as Dolly, Simon Marshall's secretary
 David Janson (as David Jaxon) as Charley, a young boy Ringo encounters

Uncredited:
 Kenneth Haigh as Simon Marshall
 Julian Holloway as Adrian, Simon's assistant
 John Bluthal as a car thief
 Michael Trubshawe as the casino manager
 Margaret Nolan as the buxom girl at the casino
 Pattie Boyd as Jean, a blonde schoolgirl on the train
 Prudence Bury as Rita, a brunette schoolgirl on the train
 Jeremy Lloyd as a nightclub dancer
 Charlotte Rampling as a nightclub dancer
 Phil Collins as a schoolboy watching the Beatles' TV performance
 Marianne Stone as Society Reporter at theatre
 Derek Nimmo as Leslie Jackson, the magician
 Terry Hooper as casino croupier

Songs 
The film's credits incorrectly state that all songs are composed by John Lennon and Paul McCartney. In the film, a portion of "Don't Bother Me" can be heard which is a George Harrison composition. The instrumentals are recorded by the George Martin Orchestra.
 "A Hard Day's Night" (opening credits)
 "I Should Have Known Better"
 "I Wanna Be Your Man" (sample)
 "Don't Bother Me" (Harrison) (sample)
 "All My Loving" (sample)
 "If I Fell"
 "Can't Buy Me Love"
 "And I Love Her"
 "I'm Happy Just to Dance with You"
 "Ringo's Theme (This Boy)" (instrumental)
 "A Hard Day's Night" (sample, instrumental)
 "Can't Buy Me Love" (reprise)
 "Tell Me Why"
 "If I Fell" (reprise)
 "I Should Have Known Better" (reprise)
 "She Loves You"
 "A Hard Day's Night" (reprise; closing credits)

In addition to the soundtrack album, an EP (in mono) of songs from the film titled Extracts From The Film A Hard Day's Night was released by Parlophone on 6 November 1964, having the following tracks:
 Side A

 "I Should Have Known Better"
 "If I Fell"
 Side B

 "Tell Me Why"
 "And I Love Her"

Song notes 
 "I'll Cry Instead" was among several songs considered for the film but ultimately not included either as an on-camera performance or for usage as an audio-only track. It was to be used during the "escape/fire escape" sequence of the film, but ultimately director Richard Lester vetoed it because of its downbeat lyrics and it was replaced for that scene by "Can't Buy Me Love". Its status as an early contender for inclusion led to the song being included on the US soundtrack album.
 In the 1982 US theatrical reissue of the film by Universal Pictures, under licence from Walter Shenson, the song "I'll Cry Instead" was used as the audio track for a prologue sequence to the film which consisted of stills from the film and publicity photographs as a tribute to Lennon consisting of a "Swingin'" early to mid-1960s-style collage of photos of the Beatles in 1964 around the time they were shooting the film. The prologue was assembled without the involvement or knowledge of the film's director Richard Lester, who subsequently expressed his disapproval of the addition. The prologue was not included on the 2000 restoration of the film.
 The song "You Can't Do That" was filmed as part of the film's TV concert sequence, but was not included in the final cut of the film. At a point before a decision had been made to excise the song from the film, footage of that performance had been sent by the filmmakers and Brian Epstein to be aired on The Ed Sullivan Show as a tease to promote the forthcoming release of the film. The clip aired on the Sullivan show on Sunday, 24 May 1964 in conjunction with an interview with The Beatles specially filmed by Sullivan in London. An extract of the footage of the song performance was included in the 1994 documentary The Making of "A Hard Day's Night".
 The song "I Call Your Name" was cut from the film for unknown reasons.

Screenplay 
The screenplay was written by Alun Owen, who was chosen because the Beatles were familiar with his play No Trams to Lime Street, and he had shown an aptitude for Liverpudlian dialogue. McCartney commented, "Alun hung around with us and was careful to try and put words in our mouths that he might've heard us speak, so I thought he did a very good script." Owen spent several days with the group, who told him their lives were like "a train and a room and a car and a room and a room and a room"; the character of Paul's grandfather refers to this in the dialogue. Owen wrote the script from the viewpoint that the Beatles had become prisoners of their own fame, their schedule of performances and studio work having become punishing.

The script comments cheekily on the Beatles' fame. For instance, at one point a fan, played by Anna Quayle, apparently recognises John Lennon, though she does not actually mention Lennon's name, saying only "you are...". He demurs, saying his face is not quite right for "him", initiating a surreal dialogue ending with the fan, after she puts on her glasses, agreeing that Lennon doesn't "look like him at all", and Lennon saying to himself that "she looks more like him than I do". Other dialogue is derived from actual interviews with the Beatles. When Ringo is asked if he's a mod or a rocker, he replies: "Uh, no, I'm a mocker", a line derived from a joke he made on the TV show Ready Steady Go!. The frequent reference to McCartney's grandfather (Wilfrid Brambell) as a "clean old man" sets up a contrast with the stock description of Brambell's character, Albert Steptoe in Steptoe and Son, as a "dirty old man".

Audiences also responded to the Beatles' brash social impudence. Director Richard Lester said, "The general aim of the film was to present what was apparently becoming a social phenomenon in this country. Anarchy is too strong a word, but the quality of confidence that the boys exuded! Confidence that they could dress as they liked, speak as they liked, talk to the Queen as they liked, talk to the people on the train who 'fought the war for them' as they liked. ... [Everything was] still based on privilege—privilege by schooling, privilege by birth, privilege by accent, privilege by speech. The Beatles were the first people to attack this... they said if you want something, do it. You can do it. Forget all this talk about talent or ability or money or speech. Just do it."

Despite the fact that the original working titles of the film were first The Beatles and then Beatlemania, the group's name is never spoken in the film—it is, however, visible on Ringo's drum kit, on the stage lighting, and on the helicopter in the final scene. The television performance scene also contains a visual pun on the group's name, with photos of beetles visible on the wall behind the dancers.

Production 
The film was shot for United Artists (UA) using a cinéma vérité style in black-and-white. The film was meant to be released in July 1964, and since it was already March when Lester got to filming, the entire film had to be produced over a period of sixteen weeks. It had a low budget for its time of £200,000 ($500,000) and filming was finished in under seven weeks, leaving the rest of the time for post-production. At first, the film itself was something of a secondary consideration to UA, whose primary interest was in being able to release the soundtrack album in the United States before Capitol Records (the American EMI affiliate who had first shot at releasing Beatles music in the States) got around to issuing their material; in the words of Bud Ornstein, the European head of production for United Artists: "Our record division wants to get the soundtrack album to distribute in the States, and what we lose on the film we'll get back on this disc." As film historian Stephen Glynn put it, A Hard Day's Night was intended as "a low-budget exploitation film to milk the latest brief musical craze for all it was worth."

Unlike most productions, it was filmed in near sequential order, as stated by Lennon in 1964. Filming began on 2 March 1964 at Marylebone station in London (sometimes misidentified as Paddington). The Beatles had joined the actors' union, Equity, only that morning. The first week of filming was on a train travelling between London and Minehead. On 10 March, scenes with Ringo were shot at the Turk's Head pub in Twickenham, and over the following week various interior scenes were filmed at Twickenham Studios. From 23 to 30 March, filming moved to the Scala Theatre, and on 31 March, concert footage was shot there, although the group mimed to backing tracks. On the 17 March and the 17 April scenes were shot at the Les Ambassadeurs Club in Mayfair. The "Can't Buy Me Love" segment, which featured creative camera work and the band running and jumping around in a field was shot on 23 April 1964 at Thornbury Playing Fields, Isleworth, West London. The final scene was filmed the following day in West Ealing, London, where Ringo obligingly drops his coat over puddles for a lady to step on, only to discover that the final puddle is actually a large hole in the road.

Before A Hard Day's Night was released in America, a United Artists executive asked Lester to dub the voices of the group with mid-Atlantic accents. McCartney angrily replied, "Look, if we can understand a fucking cowboy talking Texan, they can understand us talking Liverpool." Lester subsequently directed the Beatles' 1965 film, Help!

The film's costumes—except for those of the Beatles themselves—were designed by Julie Harris. The clothes of the Beatles were credited to Dougie Millings & Son.

Casting 
Irish actor Wilfrid Brambell, who played Paul McCartney's fictional grandfather John McCartney, was already well known to British television audiences as co-star of the British sitcom Steptoe and Son. The recurring joke that he was very "clean" reflects a contrast to his sitcom role, where he was always referred to as a "dirty old man". 
For American audiences the comment was more of a spoof on the Beatles continually being referenced as "very clean". Norman Rossington played the Beatles' manager Norm, John Junkin played the group's road manager Shake, and Victor Spinetti played the television director. Brian Epstein, the group's real manager, had an uncredited bit part.

The supporting cast included Richard Vernon as the "city gent" on the train and Lionel Blair as a featured dancer. There were also various cameos. John Bluthal played a car thief and an uncredited Derek Nimmo appeared as magician Leslie Jackson. David Janson (billed as David Jaxon here) played the small boy met by Ringo on his "walkabout". Rooney Massara, who went on to compete in the 1972 Munich Olympics, was the sculler in the river in the "walkabout" scene by the river at Kew (uncredited). Kenneth Haigh appeared as an advertising executive who mistakes George for a "new phenomenon". David Langton also made a cameo appearance as an actor in the dressing room scene.

Mal Evans, one of the Beatles' road managers, also appears briefly in the film—moving an upright bass through a tight hallway as Lennon talks with the woman who mistakes him for someone else.

George Harrison met his wife-to-be, Patricia Boyd, on the set when she made a brief (uncredited) appearance as one of the schoolgirls on the train. His initial overtures to her were spurned because she had a boyfriend at the time, but he persisted and they were married within 18 months. The girl with Boyd in the dining car scene is Prudence Bury. Phil Collins, later a member of the band Genesis, was an uncredited schoolboy extra in the concert audience and would subsequently go on to be a very successful musician in his own right.
Playing the buxom woman with Paul's grandfather in the casino scene was popular British 1960s pinup model Margaret Nolan (aka Vicky Kennedy), who also appeared as "Dink", the golden girl during the opening credits of the James Bond film Goldfinger, later that same year.

Cut for BBFC 
The film had to be edited slightly to obtain the U certificate for British cinemas. The phrase "get knotted" (allegedly in reel 7 of the original submission) was judged inappropriate for a U film and had to be removed. When the film was submitted for release on VHS, the British Board of Film Censors (BBFC) could not locate the phrase and presumed that the clip was "pre-cut", but stated that the phrase was no longer of any concern. The BBFC noted a number of innuendos and one subtle reference to cocaine, but concluded that it was still within the "natural category" for a U certificate.

Reception 
The film premiered at the Pavilion Theatre in London on 6 July 1964—the eve of Ringo Starr's 24th birthday—and the soundtrack was released four days later. A Hard Day's Night set records at the London Pavilion by grossing over $20,000 in the first week, ultimately becoming so popular that more than 1,600 prints were in circulation simultaneously.

Critical response 
Reviews of the film were mostly positive; one oft-quoted assessment was provided by Andrew Sarris of The Village Voice, labeling A Hard Day's Night "the Citizen Kane of jukebox musicals." When The Village Voice published the results of its first annual film poll, A Hard Day's Night placed second behind Stanley Kubrick's Dr. Strangelove. On Rotten Tomatoes the film holds an approval rating of 98% based on 109 reviews, with an average rating of 8.5/10. The website's critics consensus reads: "A Hard Day's Night, despite its age, is still a delight to watch and has proven itself to be a rock-and-roll movie classic." It is number four on Rotten Tomatoes' list of the Top Ten Musicals and Performing Arts films. On Metacritic, it has a weighted average score of 96 out of 100, based on 24 critics, indicating "universal acclaim".

Time magazine called the film "One of the smoothest, freshest, funniest films ever made for purposes of exploitation." Film critic Roger Ebert described the film as "one of the great life-affirming landmarks of the movies", and added it to his list of The Great Movies. In 2004, Total Film magazine named A Hard Day's Night the 42nd greatest British film of all time. In 2005, Time.com named it one of the 100 best films of the last 80 years. Leslie Halliwell gave the film his highest rating, four stars, the only British film of 1964 to achieve that accolade.

The New York Times film critic Bosley Crowther noted the film was a subtle satire on Beatlemania and the Beatles themselves. The Beatles are portrayed as likeable young lads who are constantly amazed at the attention they receive and who want nothing more than a little peace and quiet; however, they have to deal with screaming crowds, journalists who ask nonsensical questions, and authority figures who constantly look down upon them. In fact, their biggest problem is McCartney's elderly, but "clean" grandfather, played by Wilfrid Brambell. The New Yorker critic Brendan Gill wrote: "Though I don't pretend to understand what makes these four rather odd-looking boys so fascinating to so many scores of millions of people, I admit that I feel a certain mindless joy stealing over me as they caper about uttering sounds."

A Hard Day's Night was nominated for two Academy Awards: for Best Screenplay (Alun Owen), and Best Score (Adaptation) (George Martin).

By 1971, the film was estimated to have earned $11 million worldwide.

Influence 
British critic Leslie Halliwell states the film's influence as "it led directly to all the kaleidoscopic swinging London spy thrillers and comedies of the later sixties". In particular, the visuals and storyline are credited with inspiring The Monkees' television series. The "Can't Buy Me Love" segment borrowed stylistically from Richard Lester's earlier The Running Jumping & Standing Still Film, and it is this segment, in particular using the contemporary technique of cutting the images to the beat of the music, which has been cited as a precursor of modern music videos. Roger Ebert goes even further, crediting Lester for a more pervasive influence, even constructing "a new grammar": "he influenced many other films. Today when we watch TV and see quick cutting, hand-held cameras, interviews conducted on the run with moving targets, quickly intercut snatches of dialogue, music under documentary action and all the other trademarks of the modern style, we are looking at the children of A Hard Day's Night". Film theorist James Monroe writes, "The lively 1960s films of Richard Lester—especially his Musicals A Hard Day's Night (1964), Help! (1965), and A Funny Thing Happened on the Way to the Forum (1966)—popularized jump cuts, rapid and 'ungrammatical' cutting. Over time, his brash editorial style became a norm, now celebrated every night around the world in hundreds of music videos on MTV and in countless commercials." A Hard Day's Night also inspired a 1965 film featuring Gerry and the Pacemakers, entitled Ferry Cross the Mersey. In an interview for the DVD re-release of A Hard Day's Night, Lester said he had been labelled the father of MTV and had jokingly responded by asking for a paternity test.

Title 
The film's title originated from something said by Ringo Starr, who described it this way in an interview with disc jockey Dave Hull in 1964: "We went to do a job, and we'd worked all day and we happened to work all night. I came up still thinking it was day I suppose, and I said, 'It's been a hard day ...' and I looked around and saw it was dark so I said, '... night!' So we came to A Hard Day's Night."

According to Lennon in a 1980 interview with Playboy magazine: "I was going home in the car, and Dick Lester suggested the title, 'Hard Day's Night' from something Ringo had said. I had used it in In His Own Write, but it was an off-the-cuff remark by Ringo. You know, one of those malapropisms. A Ringo-ism, where he said it not to be funny... just said it. So Dick Lester said, 'We are going to use that title.'"

In a 1994 interview for The Beatles Anthology, however, McCartney disagreed with Lennon's recollections, recalling that it was the Beatles, and not Lester, who had come up with the idea of using Starr's verbal misstep: "The title was Ringo's. We'd almost finished making the film, and this fun bit arrived that we'd not known about before, which was naming the film. So we were sitting around at Twickenham studios having a little brain-storming session ... and we said, 'Well, there was something Ringo said the other day.' Ringo would do these little malapropisms, he would say things slightly wrong, like people do, but his were always wonderful, very lyrical ... they were sort of magic even though he was just getting it wrong. And he said after a concert, 'Phew, it's been a hard day's night.'"

Yet another version of events appeared in 1996; producer Walter Shenson said that Lennon had described to him some of Starr's funnier gaffes, including "a hard day's night", whereupon Shenson immediately decided that that was going to be the title of the film.

Regardless of which of these origin stories is the true one, the original tentative title for the film had been "Beatlemania" and when the new title was agreed upon, it became necessary to write and quickly record a new title song, which was completed on 16 April, just eight days before filming was finished. John Lennon wrote the song in one night, (credited to Lennon-McCartney) writing the lyrics on the back of a birthday card sent to his young son Julian, and it went on to win a Grammy for Best Performance by a Vocal Group.

The film was titled Yeah Yeah Yeah in Germany and Sweden, Tutti Per Uno (All for One) in Italy, Quatre garçons dans le vent (Four Boys in the Wind) in France Yeah! Yeah! Tässä tulemme!  (Yeah! Yeah! Here We Come!) in Finland and Os Reis do Iê-Iê-Iê (The Kings of Yeah-yeah-yeah) in Brazil.

Novelisation 
In 1964, Pan Books published a novelisation of the film by author John Burke, described as "based on the original screenplay by Alun Owen". The book was priced at two shillings and sixpence and contained an 8-page section of photographs from the film. It is the first book in the English language to have the word 'grotty' in print.

Release history 
 1964: A Hard Day's Night was released by United Artists.
 1967: The film premiered on American television on the NBC network on 24 October; the usual Peacock introduction, which preceded all NBC color broadcasts of the era, was replaced by a humorous black-and-white animated cartoon penguin, with cartoon representations of the Beatles jumping out of its stomach, as A Hard Day's Night was not shot in color;
 1970: The film premiered on UK television on BBC1 on 28 December. John Lennon watched the broadcast at home and was inspired to write the song "I'm the Greatest", which was later recorded by Ringo Starr on his 1973 album Ringo.
 1979: Rights to the film were transferred to its producer, Walter Shenson;
 1982: Universal Pictures, under license from Shenson, reissued the film in theaters. This release included a prologue consisting of production stills set to the song "I'll Cry Instead", which would remain on subsequent home video editions until 2000;
 1984: MPI Home Video, under license from Shenson, first released A Hard Day's Night on home video in the VHS, Betamax, CED Videodisc, and Laserdisc formats, which all included the prologue.
 The film was also released by Janus Films as part of The Criterion Collection in both a single-disc CLV and a DualDisc CAV Laserdisc format. The additional features section on the CAV edition include the original theatrical trailer, an interview with Richard Lester, and his The Running Jumping & Standing Still Film.
 There were notable pitch problems with the songs in this version, precisely one semitone lower than the original recordings. This was fixed in subsequent releases.
 1993: Voyager Company produced a CD-ROM for Mac and PC platforms with video in QuickTime 1 format, containing most of Criterion's elements, including the original script.
 1997: MPI Home Video released the first DVD edition. It contains the 1982 prologue and trailer, newsreels, an interview with Richard Lester, and The Running Jumping & Standing Still Film.
 2000: Miramax Films reissued the film in theatres in the United States and then as a collector's edition DVD two years later, as well as its final issue in the VHS format. The film had been transferred from the restored 35 mm negative and presented in 1.66:1 Widescreen. The prologue that Universal added in 1982 is absent on the Miramax releases.
 In addition to the original film, the DVD edition contained a bonus disc with over 7 hours of additional material including interviews with cast and crew members and Beatles associates. The DVD was produced by Beatles historian and producer Martin Lewis, a longtime friend of Walter Shenson.
 2009: The film was released on Blu-ray Disc in Canada; however, the disc is region free and will play in any Blu-ray machine. It contains most of the 2000 DVD bonus features.
 2010: Miramax was sold by Disney to Filmyard Holdings, LLC, and the home video sub-licence transferred to Lionsgate, although no U.S. Blu-ray release date had been announced.
 2011: A new Blu-ray edition was released in Mexico, this version has Spanish subtitles.
 2014: Janus Films acquired the rights to the film from Miramax (on behalf of the Shenson Estate, managed by Bruce A. Karsh) and announced a domestic video re-release via The Criterion Collection on 24 June 2014. This dual-format edition (which incorporates the first ever U.S. issue on Blu-ray) contains various supplements from all previous video re-issues. This marks the return of this film to Criterion for the first time in two decades. The film was also released in theaters across the U.S. and in the UK (by Metrodome in the latter region) on 4 July 2014. On 6 July 2014, the film was shown in re-mastered HD on BBC Four in the UK to mark its 50th anniversary. Criterion's DVD/Blu-ray release of A Hard Day's Night was duplicated by Umbrella Entertainment in Australia (released 2 July) and Second Sight Films in the UK (released 21 July).
 2015: On 15 December, Criterion re-released their Blu-ray as part of The Rock Box, a collection of rock music-related films that also includes Monterey Pop (1968), Gimme Shelter (1970) and Quadrophenia (1979).
 2022: On 11 August 2021, Criterion announced their first 4K Ultra HD releases, a six-film slate, will include A Hard Day's Night.  Criterion indicate each title will be available in a 4K UHD+Blu-ray combo pack including a 4K UHD disc of the feature film as well as the film and special features on the companion Blu-ray. A Hard's Day Night was released on 18 January 2022.

40th anniversary cast and crew reunion screening 
On 6 July 2004, the 40th anniversary of the film's world premiere, a private cast and crew reunion screening was hosted in London by DVD producer Martin Lewis. The screening was attended by McCartney, actors Victor Spinetti, John Junkin, David Janson and many crew members. In media interviews at the event, McCartney disclosed that while he had seen the film many times on video, he had not seen the film on the "big screen" since its 1964 premiere.

See also 
 1964 in film

Notes

References

External links 

 
 
 
 
 
 
 
 Literature on A Hard Day's Night
 I Wanna Hold Your Hand: All Perfectly Normal an essay by Scott Tobias at the Criterion Collection

1964 films
1964 musical comedy films
1960s teen films
British black-and-white films
British musical comedy films
1960s English-language films
Films about the Beatles
Films directed by Richard Lester
Films set in London
Jukebox musical films
Rail transport films
British rock music films
1964 musical films
Films shot in London
1960s British films